Andreas Johannes Kirkerup (9 June 1749 – 22 October 1810) was a Danish architect and master builder, one of the most significant pupils of Caspar Frederik Harsdorff. Together with architects such as Andreas Hallander and Johan Martin Quist, he played a major role in the rebuilding of Copenhagen after the Great Fire of 1795.

Early life and education
Kirkerup was born in on 9 June 1749 Copenhagen, the son of carpenter Johannes Andreasen Kirkerup (død 1755) and Dorothea Pedersdatter Wiese. Kirkerup followed in his father's footsteps, training under master builder Johan Boye Junge (1735–1807) who endorsed him to study architecture at the Royal Danish Academy of Fine Arts where he studied under Caspar Frederik Harsdorff (1735 – 1799). He won the Academy's small and large silver medals in 1768, the small gold medal in 1771 and finally the large gold medal in 1773.

Career
Kirkerup set up a business as master carpenter in 1774 and was appointed architect for the engineering troops. He won great recognition for his work and was appointed Court Carpenter in 1775 and Court Architect in 1991.

He was one of a select group of Harsdorff's students from the Academy, together with architects such as Andreas Hallander and Johan Martin Quist, who obtained a near monopoly on the rebuilding of Copenhagen after the Great Fire of 1795.

Other pursuits
The group of builders which Kirkerup belonged to reinforced their friendship and professional connections through their membership of lodges, the Royal Copenhagen Shooting Society, the civil guard and the fire corps.

Still a student, Kirkerup enrolled in the fire corps in 1772 and was promoted through the ranks. He led the efforts to control the fire during the British Bombardment of Copenhagen in 1807 but was severely hurt in the line of duty. He died a few years later from his wounds and was buried at Frederiksberg Church.

Selected works
 Corselitze, Falster (1775–77, attributed)
 Dronninggård, Holte (1783, attributed)
 Arresødal, Frederiksværk (1786)
 Edelgave, Egedal (1791)
 Liselund, Møn (1782)
 Royal Horse Guards Barracks, Copenhagen (1792)
 Brede House, Kongens Lyngby (1795)
 Store Frederikslund (1782–90)
Garrison Hospital extension, Copenhagen (1799–1800)
 Chinese Summerhouse, Frederiksberg Gardens, Copenhagen (1799–1801)

References

External links

 Andreas Kirkerup at Kunstindeks Danmark

18th-century Danish architects
Danish neoclassical architects
1749 births
1810 deaths
Royal Danish Academy of Fine Arts alumni